A rubber stamp, as a political metaphor, is a person or institution with considerable de jure power but little de facto power — one that rarely or never disagrees with more powerful organizations. Historian Edward S. Ellis called this type of legislature a toy parliament.

In situations where this superior official's signature may frequently be required for routine paperwork, a literal rubber stamp is used, with a likeness of their hand-written signature. In essence, the term is meant to convey an endorsement without careful thought or personal investment in the outcome, especially since it is usually expected as the stamper's duty to do so. In the situation where a dictator's legislature is a "rubber stamp", the orders they are meant to endorse are formalities they are expected to legitimize, and are usually done to create the superficial appearance of legislative and dictatorial harmony rather than because they have actual power.

In a constitutional monarchy or parliamentary republic, heads of state are typically "rubber stamps" (or figureheads) to an elected parliament, even if they legally possess considerable reserve powers or disagree with the parliament's decisions. 

Rubber-stamp legislatures may occur even in democratic countries if the institutional arrangement allows for it.

Examples 
Historian Edward S. Ellis described Ottoman Sultan Abdul Hamid II's General Assembly of the Ottoman Empire as a toy parliament. It was created in 1876 with the sole purpose of appeasing the European powers.

One of the most famous examples of a rubber stamp institution is the Reichstag of Nazi Germany, which unanimously confirmed all decisions already made by Adolf Hitler and the highest-ranking members of the Nazi Party. Many legislatures of authoritarian and totalitarian countries are considered as rubber stamps, such as communist parliaments like the Chinese National People's Congress, or the Italian Chamber of Fasces and Corporations during the Fascist regime.

During the reign of Adolf Frederick, King of Sweden (1751–71), the Riksdag of the Estates had the power to sign binding documents with a literal name stamp, sometimes against the will of the king who by law was an absolute monarch.

In many instances, the refusal of a constitutional monarch to rubber stamp laws passed by parliament can set off a constitutional crisis. For example, when then-king Baudouin of Belgium, because of his religious objections, refused to sign a bill legalizing abortions in April 1990, the Belgian Federal Parliament declared him temporarily unable to reign. That effectively transferred his powers to the Cabinet, for a single day, consequentially overriding his veto.

List of rubber-stamp legislatures

Defunct legislatures 
 Reichstag – Nazi Germany
  Chamber of Fasces and Corporations – Fascist Italy 
  General Assembly – Ottoman Empire
  Grand National Assembly – Turkey (1920–1950)
  Congress of Soviets, Supreme Soviet – Soviet Union
  Great National Assembly – Communist Romania
  Volkskammer – East Germany (apart from last legislative period following the first free election in East Germany in 1990)
  Supreme Soviet – Byelorussian SSR
  Supreme Soviet – Ukrainian SSR
  2017 Constituent National Assembly – Venezuela
  Cortes Españolas – Francoist Spain
 Roman Senate and Byzantine Senate – Roman Empire, Papal States, and Byzantine Empire
  National Consultative Assembly – Pahlavi Iran
  Revolutionary Command Council  – Ba'athist Iraq 
  Estates General – Kingdom of France before the French Revolution
  National Assembly and Federal Assembly – Communist Czechoslovakia
  Batasang Pambansa – Fourth Philippine Republic
  Legislative Council – Zaire
  Southern Court - The French protectorates of Annam and Tonkin (French Indochina)

Legislatures with rubber-stamp history 
 National Assembly – Communist Bulgaria
 National Assembly – Communist Hungary
:
 Louisiana State Legislature – Louisiana under Huey Long
 Sejm – Communist Poland
 National Assembly – Estado Novo
 Federal Senate – Brazil under Military dictatorship between 1977 and 1985
 National Assembly – South Korea prior to democratization
 Legislative Yuan, Control Yuan and National Assembly – Chinese Republic on Taiwan under martial law and civil war
 Congress of the Union – Institutional Revolutionary Party rule in Mexico between 1946 and 2000

Current rubber-stamp legislatures 
 National Assembly – Belarus
 National People's Congress – People's Republic of China
 Legislative Council - Hong Kong (after the 2021 election)
 Legislative Assembly – Macau
 National Assembly of People's Power – Cuba
 Parliament – Egypt
 Assembly of Experts – Iran (not a parliamentary chamber but a deliberative body)
 Supreme People's Assembly – North Korea
 Federal Assembly – Russia (after the 2003 elections)
 People's Assembly – Syria
  National Council – Turkmenistan
  National Assembly – Vietnam
  National Assembly – Laos
  National Assembly – Djibouti
  National Assembly – Eritrea
  Parliament of Equatorial Guinea – Equatorial Guinea
  Consultative Assembly of Saudi Arabia – Saudi Arabia

References

Political metaphors
Metaphors referring to objects